Raymond Mendy (born 7 January 1996) is a Gambian footballer who plays as a midfielder for Sandvikens IF.

He spend his early childhood in London corner, where he had been playing good football in his childhood days. His Nick name was Un'dooo.

References

1996 births
Living people
Gambian footballers
Association football midfielders
CS Sfaxien players
Olympique Béja players
Gżira United F.C. players
Skellefteå FF players
Bodens BK players
Sandvikens IF players
Tunisian Ligue Professionnelle 1 players
Ettan Fotboll players
Gambian expatriate footballers
Expatriate footballers in Tunisia
Expatriate footballers in Malta
Expatriate footballers in Sweden
Gambian expatriate sportspeople in Tunisia
Gambian expatriate sportspeople in Malta
Gambian expatriate sportspeople in Sweden